"Something Good" is a song by English electronic music duo Utah Saints. It was first included as the opening song on a seven-track EP titled Something Good, then later included on their debut album, Utah Saints (1992). The song contains a vocal sample from Kate Bush's "Cloudbusting", which had been a top-20 UK hit in 1985. Issued as a single on 25 May 1992, it reached number four on the UK Singles Chart as well as number seven on the US Billboard Hot Dance Club Play chart. The BBC used the song during its coverage of the Opening Ceremony of the Barcelona Olympic Games of 1992 and was also used for Carlton Television's pre-launch trailer.

In 2007, the track was remixed by Australian band Van She under their electro remix pseudonym, "Van She Tech", and released in March 2008 as "Something Good '08" with a new music video. Bush's vocal sample was re-recorded by Davina Perera—a West End singer/actress and former Pop Idol contestant—but remained the focal point of the song. The remix entered the top 10 on downloads alone, climbing to number eight on the UK Singles Chart after the CD release. It was the band's first top-20 hit in 15 years.

Critical reception
Jon Wilde from Melody Maker wrote, "Kate Bush's ravishing "Cloudbusting" sampled to good effect and transformed into a whirligig electo-swirl that is packed with the kind of lecherous tics that are always guaranteed to separate this kind of stuff from the massed ranks of the frighteningly ordinary."

"Something Good '08" music video
The music video for "Something Good '08", set in a Cardiff bar on St David's Day 1989, and featuring the 'Running Man' dance, was directed by Eran Creevy and choreographed by Kate Prince of ZooNation. It featured lead dancer Anthony Trahearn, dancers Jessica Grist and Simone Edwards, Lee Toomes as the DJ and Matthew Medland as Benjamin Pew. Jez Willis and Tim Garbutt of Utah Saints cameo in the video, as the pool players standing in front of the pool table.

The video won the category for Best Dance Video at the UK Music Video Awards 2008. In 2017 Complex.com placed it at number 78 in "The Best Music Videos of the 2000s".

Track listings

 "Something Good" (1992 UK CD single)
 "Something Good" (7-inch) – 3:33
 "Something Good" (12-inch) – 5:58
 "Something Good" (051 Mix) – 5:47
 "Trance Atlantic Flight" – 7:09

 "Something Good" (1992 US single)
 "Something Good" – 5:55
 "Anything Can Happen" – 3:12
 "What Can You Do for Me" – 6:06
 "Trance Atlantic Flight" – 7:08
 "Trance Europe Caress" – 5:01
 "Something Good" (051 Mix by John Kelley) – 5:45
 "What Can You Do for Me" (Salt Lake Mix) – 5:53

 "Something Good '08" (2008 UK CD maxi single)
 "Something Good '08" (radio edit) – 2:44
 "Something Good '08" (Van She Tech Mix)
 "Something Good '08" (High Contrast Remix)
 "Something Good '08" (Warren Clarke Remix)
 "Something Good '08" (Ian Carey Remix)
 "Something Good '08" (Prok & Fitch Remix)
 "Something Good '08" (eSquire Remix)
 "Something Good '08" (Video)

 "Something Good '09" (2009 US digital EP)
 "Something Good '09" (radio edit) – 2:42
 "Something Good '09" (Warren Clarke radio edit)
 "Something Good '09" (Van She Tech Mix)
 "Something Good '09" (eSquire Remix)
 "Something Good '09" (Bart B More Remix)

Charts

"Something Good"

Weekly charts

Year-end charts

"Something Good '08"

Weekly charts

Year-end charts

Certifications

References

1992 songs
1992 singles
2008 singles
Utah Saints songs
London Records singles
Songs written by Kate Bush